The Arizona Department of Economic Security (DES) is a government agency of the State of Arizona. DES works with families, community organizations, advocates and state and federal partners to work towards allowing every child, adult, and family in Arizona to be safe and economically secure.

DES works to promote enhanced safety and well-being for Arizonans by focusing on three primary goals:
 Strengthening individuals and families;
 Increasing self-sufficiency; and,
 Developing the capacity of communities.

Economic Security
1972 establishments in Arizona